The Churchill Craton is the northwest section of the Canadian Shield and stretches from southern Saskatchewan and Alberta to northern Nunavut. It has a very complex geological history punctuated by at least seven distinct regional tectonometamorphic intervals, including many discrete accretionary magmatic events. The Western Churchill province is the part of the Churchill Craton that is exposed north and west of the Hudson Bay. The Archean (ca. 1.83 Ga) Western Churchill province contributes to the complicated and protracted tectonic history of the craton and marks a major change in the behaviour of the Churchill Craton with many remnants of Archean supracrustal and granitoid rocks.

Major tectonometamorphic intervals
 2.69 Ga: deformation in the northern Hearne Domain.
 2.685 Ga: greenschist-grade metamorphism and deformation in the central Hearne Domain.
 2.60 Ga: granitoid plutonism across the northern Hearne and Rae Domains.
 2.50-2.55 Ga: metamorphism and deformation in the northern Hearne domain.
 1.9 Ga: metamorphism and deformation in the northern Hearne Domain.
 1.83 Ga: magmatism and deformation in the northern Hearne and Rae Domains.
 1.755 Ga: plutonism in the western Hearne and eastern Rae Domains.

Hearne Domain, Western Churchill province

A north-northwest-trending crustal segment transects from Kaminak Lake (central Hearne Domain) in the south to Yathkyed Lake (northern Hearne Domain) in the northwest, consisting of Archean supracrustal belts that preserve mostly Archean mafic to felsic volcanic rocks (greenschist-grade supracrustal and granitoids), metamorphic cooling of hornblende and Proterozoic biotite. 

This section of the Churchill province was formerly called the Ennadai-Rankin greenstone belt and include the Kaminak, Yathkyed, MacQuoid and Rankin supracrustal belts, containing a wide range of intrusive Neoarchean plutonic rocks ranging in composition from gabbro to syenogranite. The Kaminak supracrustal belt preserves igneous textures including interlocking quartz and plagioclase that are intergrown with platy biotite (2.084-1.914 Ga) and stubby euhedral grains of prismatic titanite and hornblende. The Yathkyed belt contains a range of hornblende cooling (2.63-246 Ga) amphibolitic metamorphic rocks. The Kaminak and Yathkyed belts are overlain by the Proterozoic (2.45 Ga) Hurwitz Group. Deformation of the Hurwitz Group occurred after the 2.11 Ga intrusion of gabbro sills, but prior to the intrusion of the 1.83 Ga lamprophyre dykes associated with the ultrapotassic lavas of the nearby Baker Lake Basin. Parallel to the Paleoproterozoic Hurwitz Group is massive veins of green biotite that are interpreted to have been emplaced there by a hydrothermal event accompanying a deformation along this contact area.

Murmac Bay Group, Western Churchill province
The Murmac Bay Group exposed in the southwestern half of the Western Churchill Craton, near Uranium City, Saskatchewan consists of a mixed package of Precambrian volcanic and sedimentary rocks These rocks sit on ca. 3 Ga granitoids and have been affected by several deformational and metamorphic events.

Taltson Magmatic Zone and Taltson basement
The Taltson Magmatic Zone (south of 60°N) is a composite continental magmatic arc and collisional orogen resulting from the convergence of the Buffalo Head terrane with the Archean Churchill craton. The Taltson basement (ca. 3.2–3.0 Ga and 2.4–2.14 Ga) and Rutledge River supracrustal gneisses (2.13–2.09 Ga) were intruded by voluminous I- and S-type magmatic rocks between 1.99 and 1.92 Ga.

Economic geology
There is aggressive diamond exploration drilling in the south Slave Province, NWT, Churchill Craton (at the northwest corner of the Hudson Bay) and in Ontario. The Northwest Territories (NWT), North Slave craton and Keewatin regions of Nunavut and the north-central region of Alberta are regions that are all underlain by diamond-friendly cratonic rocks of the Slave Craton, Churchill Craton and the Buffalo Head Craton. The diamonds being found in the NWT were created 50 to 600 mya during cataclysmic explosions of kimberlite, a molten magma originating up to 400 kilometers beneath the Earth's surface.

Unlike the Slave Craton, which is covered with shallow lakes and swamp, the eastern part of the Churchill Craton is drier. Kimberlites may be obscured by foliage rather than water, therefore many targets may be drillable during the summer, not just during the short winter window when lakes are frozen and daylight is available. In comparison, drilling in the Eastern Arctic is too remote compared to the Slave Craton, which is serviced by the fully developed infrastructure of Yellowknife. The Eastern Arctic is serviced by the smaller town of Rankin Inlet, which in turn is serviced by barge during summer.

See also
Rae Craton
Superior Craton

References

Notes

Sources

 

Cratons
Historical geology
Economic geology
Structural geology
Geology of North America
Geology of Alberta
Geology of Nunavut
Geology of Saskatchewan